Vidocq is a 1939 French historical crime film directed by Jacques Daroy and starring André Brulé, Nadine Vogel and René Ferté. The film is based on the memoirs of Eugène François Vidocq. Vidocq was a criminal in nineteenth century Paris who changed sides and became a leading detective. Illustrations created by Gaston Hoffman.

Cast

See also
A Scandal in Paris (1946)
Vidocq (2001)
The Emperor of Paris (2018)

References

Bibliography 
 Crisp, C.G. The Classic French Cinema, 1930-1960. Indiana University Press, 1993.

External links 
 

1939 films
French crime films
French historical films
1939 crime films
1930s historical films
1930s French-language films
Films directed by Jacques Daroy
Films set in Paris
Films set in the 19th century
Cultural depictions of Eugène François Vidocq
French black-and-white films
1930s French films